Septimus Arabinus Arabin (1785–1855) was an admiral in the Royal Navy of Irish/French descent.

Life

He was born in West Drayton a younger son of Colonel (later General) William John Arabin. His paternal grandfather, John Arabin was  famed for raising the 57th (West Middlesex) Regiment of Foot at the onset of the Seven Years' War. He had multiple siblings many of whom had senior ranks in the British Army plus an elder brother was the senior judge, William St Julien Arabin.

His father divorced his mother in 1786 when she was accused of adultery with Sir Thomas Sutton of Moulsey in 1786. His father then married Catherine Louisa Le Marchant of Guernsey (1771-1834), twenty years his junior, who raised Septimus and his siblings as their mother.

Whilst most of his male siblings joined the British Army, Septimus instead joined the Royal Navy. IN April 1799 he defended the city of Acre against the French fleet as part of the Egyptian campaign. He was a cadet officer on the 74 gun HMS Tigre which had been captured from the French in 1795.

In November 1802 he was ranked midshipman and transferred to the newly-launched 50-gun HMS Antelope which was base in the English Channel protecting against the potential French invasion.

In 1805 Arabin passed the Lieutenant's exam. In 1806 he was given the role of master's mate on the 74 gun HMS Pompee and was involved in major attacks on the Turkish fleet in February and March 1807 at the Dardanelles under Captain Richard Dacres. Arabin was promoted to Lieutenant in August 1807.

In August 1807 he transferred to HMS Foudroyant. Eleven days later he took place in a major sea battle: The Second Battle of Copenhagen which turned into a siege which lasted three weeks. In 1808 the Foudroyant spent many months patrolling off the South American coast. Still there in February 1810, Arabin transferred to HMS Theseus and in 1812 to HMS Tremendous, both 74 gun ships, and both based off the English coast.

Late in 1812 he transferred to the HMS Hiberia (110 guns and a crew of almost 400) as their Flag Lieutenant. He was promoted to Commander on Hibernia in July 1814, but he was immediately placed on half pay. He remained in this status for 7 years eventually being given command of the sloop HMS Argus in July 1821, serving off Halifax, Nova Scotia with a crew of 120 men. He was promoted to Captain and Commander in March 1823. In December 1825 he got a new (but final) command: the 28 gun HMS North Star.

He was retired at the rank of Rear Admiral in October 1846. He moved to the South of France on health grounds and died in Nice in the final days of December 1855.

Family

In February 1826 in the chapel of the British Embassy in Paris he married Marie Rumbold (1788-1875) daughter of Sir George Rumbold, 2nd Baronet.

References
 

1785 births
1855 deaths
People from West Drayton
British admirals